Tan Kwai Tsuen is a village in Ping Shan, Yuen Long District, Hong Kong.

Administration
Tan Kwai Tsuen is one of the 37 villages represented within the Ping Shan Rural Committee. For electoral purposes, Tan Kwai Tsuen is part of the Ping Shan South constituency.

See also
 Ping Shan South (constituency)
 Hung Shui Hang Reservoir

References

External links

 Delineation of area of existing village Tan Kwai Tsuen (Ping Shan) for election of resident representative (2019 to 2022)
 Antiquities Advisory Board. Historic Building Appraisal. Tseuk Yuen, No. 338 Tan Kwai Tsuen Pictures

Villages in Yuen Long District, Hong Kong
Ping Shan
Hung Shui Kiu